Blenheim Farm is a   nature reserve near Charlbury in Oxfordshire. It is owned and managed by the Berkshire, Buckinghamshire and Oxfordshire Wildlife Trust.

This is a meadow surrounded by ancient hedges and woodland. Flora include common knapweed, lady's bedstraw, cowslip and ragged-robin, while there are butterflies such as the common blue and orange tip. Amphibians include common frogs, common toads and smooth newts.

References

Berkshire, Buckinghamshire and Oxfordshire Wildlife Trust